Lev Vladimirovich Kuznetsov (born April 25, 1965) is a Russian politician and businessman. Since 2015 he has served as the Russian Minister for North Caucasus Affairs. From February 2010 to May 2014, Kuznetsov was the Governor of Krasnoyarsk Krai.

Previously he was an advisor on Economic Matters to Governor Alexander Khloponin, the acting mayor of Norilsk, and Khloponin's First Deputy Governor from 2003 to 2007.

He graduated from the State Finance Academy in 1990.

References

1965 births
Living people
Politicians from Moscow
Governors of Krasnoyarsk Krai
United Russia politicians
21st-century Russian politicians
Financial University under the Government of the Russian Federation alumni